The World Skate Games (formerly World Roller Games) are an international biennial multi-sport event, comprising all the world roller sport disciplines as regulated by the World Skate international federation. The games involve 11 World Championships in one multi-sport event.

Due to the 2022 Russian invasion of Ukraine, World Skate banned Russian and Belarusian athletes and officials from its competitions, and will not stage any events in Russia or Belarus in 2022.

Disciplines
The 2022 World Skate Games include the following disciplines:

Skateboarding
 Vert
 Slalom
 Downhill and Street Luge

Inline / Quad
 Speed: track and road
 Artistic
 Inline Downhill
 Inline Freestyle
 Inline Hockey
 Rink hockey
 Roller Freestyle: street, vert, park
 Skate Cross

Scooter
 Scooter street
 Scooter park

Editions

2017 World Roller Games
The 2017 World Roller Games was the first edition of the World Roller Games. It took place from August 27, 2017, to September 10, 2017, in Nanjing, China. It comprised the World Championships in 10 disciplines. Sixty one countries were represented at the games, with Colombia topping the medals table with 25 gold medals, followed by Italy with 20 gold medals then France with 10. This event included the World Championships of 10 Roller Sports during a 15-day skating festival: 10 sports, 61 national federations, 193 national teams, and over 3000 athletes.

2019 World Roller Games
The 2019 World Roller Games was the second edition of the World Roller Games. It took place from June 29, 2019, to July 14, 2019, in Barcelona, Spain. It comprised the World Championships in 11 disciplines. Eighty one countries were represented at the games with a total of 4,120 athletes competing.  In total, the 11 days of the World Roller Games were held in front of 140,000 fans. Italy topped the medal table with 21 golds, 18 silver and 24 bronze. Colombia also won 21 golds but their 16 silver and six bronze left them second.

2022 World Skate Games
Argentina was chosen to host the 2021 World Roller Games. The World Skate Executive Board, that met on 30 April 2019, unanimously entrusted Argentina with the task of organizing the World Skate Games that will take place in Buenos Aires, Vicente López and San Juan between October and November 2021.

Due to the Covid-19 pandemic the event was postponed from 2021 to 2022, and will be held October 24 to November 13. The opening ceremony held in Buenos Aires and the closing ceremony in San Juan. With the increased importance of skateboarding within the international federation World Skate, the event now goes under the name World Skate Games, and covers skateboarding, roller skating and scooter.

References

External links
World Skate website

 
Multi-sport events
Biennial sporting events
Recurring sporting events established in 2017